Cru is a 2004 album by Seu Jorge first released in France on September 21, 2004 by parisian independent label Fla-Flu (Favela Chic) with the record company Naïve. This was his second album to be released outside his native Brazil, the first being Carolina. Many of the songs on the album are covers such as "Chatterton", written by Serge Gainsbourg and "Don't" by Leiber & Stoller. The album  also includes political and social commentary in songs like "Mania de Peitão" and "Eu Sou Favela".

The song Tive Razão was featured in FIFA 07 by EA Sports.

Track listing
"Tive Razão" (I Was Right) (Seu Jorge) – 4:32
"Mania de Peitão" (Large Chested Mania) (Bento Amorim, Jorge) – 2:37
"Chatterton" (Gainsbourg) – 3:52
"Fiore de la Città" (Robertinho Brant) – 4:19
"Bem Querer" (My Dear) (Carlos Da Fé, Dom Mita) – 3:21
"Don't" (Jerry Leiber, Mike Stoller) – 3:07
"São Gonça" (Jorge) – 4:22
"Bola de Meia" (Sock-Filled Ball) (Duani) – 5:25
"Una Mujer" (A woman) (Murilo Antunes, Brant) – 4:37
"Eu Sou Favela" (I Am Favela) (Noca Da Portela, Sergio Mosca) – 2:27
"Mania de Peitao*" (Jamais Plus Jamais Mix) (Amorim, Jorge) – 2:48
"Tive Razão*" (Voltair Mix) (Jorge) – 4:38

Personnel 

Marcelo Aube – Bass
Robertinho Brant – Guitar (Acoustic), Arranger, Vocals (background), Handclapping
Edmundo Carneiro – Percussion
Mathieu Chédid – Guitar (Acoustic)
Gringo DaParada – Synthesizer, Arranger, Vocals (background), Handclapping, Producer, Synthesizer Bass
Pretinho DaSerrinha – Percussion, Arranger, Vocals (background), Handclapping, Cavaquinho
Rafael Doria – Logo
Fabio Fonseca – Synthesizer
Seu Jorge – Guitar (Acoustic), Bass, Arranger, Vocals (background), Handclapping, Adaptation, Wah Wah Guitar
Renaud Letang – Mixing
André Perillat – Mastering
Benoit Peverelli – Photography
Alexandre Rabaço – Engineer
Claudio Manetta Scott – Artwork

References

Seu Jorge albums
2005 albums
Wrasse Records albums